József Kovács (14 March 1911 – 18 August 1990) was a Hungarian athlete who competed in the 1936 Summer Olympics. He was born and died in Budapest.

Competition record

References

1911 births
1990 deaths
Hungarian male sprinters
Hungarian male hurdlers
Olympic athletes of Hungary
Athletes (track and field) at the 1936 Summer Olympics
European Athletics Championships medalists
Athletes from Budapest